Brian Fox may refer to:

 Brian Fox (computer programmer) (born 1959), computer programmer, author, and free software advocate
 Brian Fox (artist), portrait painter
 Brian James Fox, drummer known for his work with White Tiger and as a member of Silent Rage
 Brian Fox (Gaelic footballer) (born 1988), Irish Gaelic football player